Länk FC Vilaverdense (formerly known as Vilaverdense F.C.) is a Portuguese football club based in Vila Verde in the district of Braga. 

Länk FC Vilaverdense currently plays in the Liga 3, which is the third tier of Portuguese football. The club was founded in 1953 as Vilaverdense F.C. and play their home matches at Campo da Cruz do Reguengo in Vila Verde. The stadium is a 1,000 spectator all-seater.

The club is affiliated to Associação de Futebol de Braga and has competed in the AF Braga Taça. The club has also entered the national cup competition known as Taça de Portugal on occasion.

It also competes in women's football, with a more successful team playing in the first tier, Campeonato Nacional de Futebol Feminino, using the 3,000-seat Municipal Stadium.

In 2020 the club's name and crest was changed following an acquisition of 90% of the club's SAD (Anonymous Shareholder Sport Association) by Länk. These changes caused some controversy.

Involvement with Länk 
In 2020, a Canadian group named Länk acquired 90% of Vilaverdense's SAD, promising to improve the club's stadium. With this they changed the club's name to Länk Vilaverdense and its badge to one in black and white, removing the green used to represent Vila Verde ("Green Village"). The teams kits, however, are still green. Although the acquisition was approved by the club's associates, the changes made by Länk came under heavy fire by the club's supporters and caused controversy.

Season to season

Current squad

Honours
AF Braga Divisão de Honra: 2010–11
AF Braga Taça: 1988/89, 1990/91, 1992/93, 1997/98, 2009/10

Footnotes

Football clubs in Portugal
Association football clubs established in 1953
1953 establishments in Portugal
Sport in Vila Verde
Campeonato Nacional de Futebol Feminino teams